Poupartia pubescens is a species of plant in the family Anacardiaceae. It is endemic to Mauritius.  It is threatened by habitat loss.

References

pubescens
Endemic flora of Mauritius
Endangered plants
Taxonomy articles created by Polbot